The 2019 Asian Women's Club Volleyball Championship  was the 20th edition of the  Asian Women's Club Volleyball Championship, an annual international volleyball club tournament organised by the Asian Volleyball Confederation (AVC) with Chinese Volleyball Association (CVA). The tournament was held in Tianjin, China, from 27 April to 5 May 2019. The winner of this tournament qualified to 2020 FIVB Volleyball Women's Club World Championship.

Qualification
Following the AVC regulations, The maximum of 16 teams in all AVC events were be selected by 
 1 team for the organizer
 10 teams based on the rankings of the previous championship
 5 teams from each of 5 zones (with a qualification tournament if needed)

Qualified associations

 EAZVA is originally allocated with 1 team, but Indonesia, OZVA, WAZVA and SEAZVA declined to enter. The spot was reallocated to Hong Kong and North Korea.

Participating teams
The following teams were entered for the tournament.

 Generali Supreme Chonburi-E.Tech qualified as 2018 winners due to compensation after 2019 FIVB World Championship ineligible rather than Nakhon Ratchasima as 2018–19 Volleyball Thailand League winners.

Squads

Venues

Preliminary round

Pool A

|}

Pool B

|}

Final Round
 All times are China National Standard Time (UTC+08:00).

9th-10th places

9th place match

|}

Final eight

Quarterfinals

|}

5th-8th semifinals

|}

Semifinals

|}

7th place match

|}

5th place match

|}

3rd place match

|}

Final

|}

Final standing

Awards

Most Valuable Player
  Li Yingying
Best Setter
  Yao Di
Best Outside Spiker
  Li Yingying
  Hikari Kato
Best Middle Blocker
  Li Yanan
  Wang Yuanyuan
Best Opposite Spiker
  Ajcharaporn Kongyot
Best Libero
  Sayaka Tsutsui

References

Asian Women's Club Volleyball Championship
Asian Volleyball Club Championship
International volleyball competitions hosted by China
2019 in Chinese sport
V
V